Flemming "Bamse" Duun Jørgensen (7 February 19471 January 2011) was a Danish pop singer and actor, best known as lead singer of the band Bamses Venner (Teddy (Bear)'s Friends). During the recent years he also released some solo albums, the latest being Tæt på (Close-up) from 2010. Bamse was part of the Danish music scene for more than 35 years, and sold more than 3.5 million albums.

Flemming "Bamse" Jørgensen occasionally worked as an actor and in 1986 he received a Robert Award for best male supporting actor of the year in the movie Ofelia kommer til byen (Ophelia comes to town). Flemming "Bamse" Jørgensen died a month before his 64th birthday in the early hours of New Year's Day 2011 of a cardiac arrest in his home in Egå, a suburb to Aarhus.

One of his first and biggest hits was Vimmersvej (originally "Wimmersvej") was from 1975 and it was based on The Lion Sleeps Tonight. On September 13th, 2018 a road in Thisted changed name from "Kronborgvejs Sidevej" to "Vimmersvej".

Discography

With Bamses Venner
Refer to discography at Bamses Venner

Solo 
 Din sang (1977)
 Solen skinner (1979)
 Lige nu (1987)
 1988 (1988)
 Lidt for mig selv (1994)
 Jul på Vimmersvej (1995)
 Stand By Me (1999)
 Always on My Mind (2001)
 Be My Guest (2005)
 Love Me Tender (2007)
 Tæt på (2010)
 De store og de gemte (2011)

Live
Bamse Live I (1980)
Bamse Live II (1980)

References

External links 
 
 

1947 births
2011 deaths
People from Randers
Danish male singers
Danish male film actors